Evolution (The Most Recent) is an album by American blues artist Taj Mahal, which was released in 1977.

Track listing
 "Sing A Happy Song"
 "Queen Bee"
 "Lowdown Showdown"
 "The Most Recent (Evolution) Of Muthafusticus Modernusticus"
 "Why You Do Me This Way"
 "Salsa De Laventille"
 "The Big Blues"
 "Highnite"
 "Southbound With The Hammer Down"

References

1977 albums
Taj Mahal (musician) albums
Warner Records albums